Siemens Energy may refer to these Siemens subsidiaries:

Siemens Energy Sector operated from 2008 until 2014
Siemens Energy AG, established in 2020